Robert Kieffer (born January 3, 1946) is a Quebec politician, he served as the member for Groulx in the Quebec National Assembly as a member of the Parti Québécois from 1994 until 2003.

Biography

Kieffer was born in Montreal, he obtained a bachelor's degree in pedagogy from the Université de Montréal in 1967. At the Université du Québec à Montréal, he obtained a bachelor's degree in political science, specializing in international relations, he also obtained his master's degree in political science.

Kieffer was a professor of political science at Collège Lionel-Groulx from 1972 to 1994. He was a member of the executive and later the President of the Central Council of the Laurentides-Confederation of National Trade Unions.

Political career

Kieffer served as secretary and later the president of his local PQ riding executive, he later become Chairman of the National Council of the provincial party. He sought the open seat of Groulx in 1994 and won. He was re-elected without difficulty in 1998. He became the Parliamentary Secretary to Deputy Premier Bernard Landry following the election. When Landry became Premier, Kieffer followed him and became his Parliamentary Secretary.

Kieffer sought re-election in 2003, and lost by 303 votes to Liberal Pierre Descoteaux, in one of the tightest races that year.

Electoral Record

Provincial

References 

1946 births
Living people
Academics from Montreal
Parti Québécois MNAs
Politicians from Montreal
Trade unionists from Quebec
Université de Montréal alumni
Université du Québec à Montréal alumni
20th-century Canadian politicians
21st-century Canadian politicians